Nishan Velupillay (born 7 May 2001) is an Australian professional footballer who plays as a forward for Melbourne Victory.

Early life 
Velupillay was born in Melbourne, Victoria, and is of Sri Lankan Tamil descent.

Club career

Early career 
Velupillay began his career in the youth academy at Glen Eira FC.

Melbourne Victory 
Velupillay signed his first professional contract with Melbourne Victory in 2019. He made his professional debut for the club on 19 May 2021, coming on as a substitute in a 0–2 defeat against Sydney. On 11 December 2021, Velupillay scored his first professional goal, netting the winning in a 2–1 win over Adelaide United.

Honours
Melbourne Victory
FFA Cup: 2021
Young Player of the Year: 2021–22
A-League Championship: 2020–21

References

External links

2001 births
Living people
Australian soccer players
Association football forwards
Melbourne Victory FC players
National Premier Leagues players
A-League Men players
Australian people of Sri Lankan Tamil descent
Australian people of Tamil descent
Soccer players from Melbourne